The Seminole Legacy Golf Club is located in Tallahassee, Florida and is the home of the Florida State Seminoles men's golf and Florida State Seminoles women's golf teams.  It was constructed in 1962 by the architect Bill Amick.  Bob Walker renovated the course to a 7,147-yard (6,535 m) par 73 course.  In 2020 the course opened after a 10 million dollar renovation designed by famed Nicklaus Design Company.  Course was renovated into a 7,240 yard par 72 course.

The Seminole Legacy Golf Club on the Florida State University campus in Tallahassee and the Don Middleton Golf Complex was home to the school’s Professional Golf Management program. The two-story brick building has two wings that houses offices, classrooms, clubhouse, pro shop and the new Burr Family Renegade Grill.

In 2007 a new 21,000-square-foot (2,000 m2) chipping green was added in the southeast corner near the 29 driving range boxes. A 10-acre (40,000 m2) practice facility is used by the FSU golf team.

Scorecard

See also 

 Florida State Seminoles
 Golf
 Golf course

Golf clubs and courses in Florida
Florida State Seminoles
Florida State University
College golf clubs and courses in the United States
Sports in Tallahassee, Florida
1962 establishments in Florida